Berryburg is an unincorporated community in Barbour County in the U.S. state of West Virginia. Berryburg lies to the northwest of Philippi on West Virginia Route 76.

The Adaland in Berryburg is a historic house museum listed on the National Register of Historic Places. 

It is the birthplace of James H. McGee, the first black mayor of Dayton, Ohio.

References

Unincorporated communities in Barbour County, West Virginia
Unincorporated communities in West Virginia